Nic Martin is an Australian rules footballer who plays for the Essendon Football Club in the Australian Football League (AFL). He joined the club as a rookie prior to the 2022 season. He made his senior debut for Essendon against Geelong in round 1, scoring 5 goals and having 27 disposals, earning him a rising star nomination for that round.

References

External links

Essendon Football Club players
2001 births
Living people
Subiaco Football Club players
Australian rules footballers from Western Australia